Ragonese is a surname. Notable people with the name include:

Ana María Ragonese (1928–1999), Argentine botanist and paleobotanist
Isabella Ragonese (born 1981), Italian actress
Jerry Ragonese (born 1986), American lacrosse player